Robert C. Shearer (born October 19, 1976 in Kitchener, Ontario) is a former professional ice hockey player, who last played for EC VSV in the Austrian Hockey League (EBEL). In 1995 he was signed as a free agent by the Colorado Avalanche and he played 2 games for the team in 2000–01. After 10 seasons abroad in Europe, Shearer returned to North America for the 2011–12 season, signing a one-year contract with the Reading Royals of the ECHL. After scoring 15 point in 34 games, on January 13, 2012, Shearer returned to Austria signing for the remainder of the year with Villacher SV.

Career statistics

Regular season and playoffs

References

External links

 Rob Shearer's profile at Colorado Avalanche Database

1976 births
Living people
Canadian ice hockey centres
Colorado Avalanche players
EC VSV players
EHC Black Wings Linz players
Eisbären Berlin players
Hershey Bears players
Ice hockey people from Ontario
Sportspeople from Kitchener, Ontario
Reading Royals players
HC TPS players
Undrafted National Hockey League players
Windsor Spitfires players
Canadian expatriate ice hockey players in Austria
Canadian expatriate ice hockey players in Finland
Canadian expatriate ice hockey players in Germany